Hugh Smith may refer to:

Hugh Smith (American football) (1934–2016), American football wide receiver
Hugh Smith (politician) (1839–?), Ontario farmer and political figure
Hugh Smith (cricketer) (1856–1939), English cricketer
Hugh Smith (swimmer) (1910–?), British swimmer
Hugh Smith (news anchor) (1934–2007), news director and anchor at Tampa, Florida's WTVT
Hugh McCormick Smith (1865–1941), American ichthyologist and administrator in the Bureau of Fisheries
Albert Hugh Smith (1903–1967), English philologist
Hugh Colin Smith (1836–1910), Governor of the Bank of England
Hugh McClure Smith (1902–1961), Australian public servant and diplomat
Hugh J. Smith (died 1908), member of the Los Angeles City Council
Hugh Smith (priest) (1896–?), Chaplain-General of Prisons
Sir Hugh Smith, 1st Baronet (1632–1680), English politician
Hugh Crawford Smith, British Member of Parliament for Tyneside, 1900–1906

See also
Huw Smith, guitarist
Hugh Smyth (disambiguation)